The 1991 NCAA Division I men's basketball tournament involved 64 schools playing in single-elimination play to determine the national champion of men's NCAA Division I college basketball. It began on March 14, 1991, and ended with the championship game on April 1 in Indianapolis, Indiana. A total of 63 games were played.

Duke, coached by Mike Krzyzewski, won a rematch of the previous year's national final matchup against undefeated UNLV 79–77 in the semifinal, then won the national title with a 72–65 victory in the final game over Kansas, coached by Roy Williams. This was the first National Championship game for Williams as a head coach. Kansas defeated Williams' mentor Dean Smith and North Carolina (where Williams later coached) in the semifinal. Kansas made its second trip to the National Championship game in four seasons, the prior appearance being 1988 when they defeated Oklahoma. Christian Laettner of Duke was named the tournament's Most Outstanding Player.

This tournament marked the first time a #15 seed upset a #2 seed since the tournament field expanded to 64 teams in 1985, when Richmond accomplished against Syracuse in the East region.

This tournament adopted the NBA's 10ths-second timer during the final minute of each period in all arenas.

Schedule and venues

The following are the sites that were selected to host each round of the 1991 tournament:

First and Second Rounds
March 14 and 16
East Region
 Cole Field House, College Park, Maryland (Host: University of Maryland, College Park)
Midwest Region
 Hubert H. Humphrey Metrodome, Minneapolis, Minnesota (Host: University of Minnesota)
Southeast Region
 Freedom Hall, Louisville, Kentucky (Host: University of Louisville)
West Region
 Jon M. Huntsman Center, Salt Lake City, Utah (Host: University of Utah)
March 15 and 17
East Region
 Carrier Dome, Syracuse, New York (Host: Syracuse University)
Midwest Region
 University of Dayton Arena, Dayton, Ohio (Host: University of Dayton)
Southeast Region
 Omni Coliseum, Atlanta, Georgia (Host: Georgia Institute of Technology)
West Region
 McKale Center, Tucson, Arizona (Host: University of Arizona)

Regional semifinals and finals (Sweet Sixteen and Elite Eight)
March 21 and 23
Southeast Regional, Charlotte Coliseum, Charlotte, North Carolina (Host: University of North Carolina at Charlotte)
West Regional, Kingdome, Seattle, Washington (Host: University of Washington)
March 22 and 24
East Regional, Brendan Byrne Arena, East Rutherford, New Jersey (Hosts: Seton Hall University, Big East Conference)
Midwest Regional, Pontiac Silverdome, Pontiac, Michigan (Host: University of Detroit Mercy)

National semifinals and championship (Final Four and championship)
March 30 and April 1
Hoosier Dome, Indianapolis, Indiana (Hosts: Butler University, Midwestern Collegiate Conference)

For the second time, Indianapolis was the host of the Final Four, this time at the Hoosier Dome, which would host the Final Four three more times. The tournament also returned to Charlotte in 1991, this time to the new Charlotte Coliseum, then the off-campus home of the Charlotte 49ers men's basketball team. This year also saw the final appearance of the Pontiac Silverdome and two former Final Four venues, in Cole Field House and Freedom Hall. Games played in Detroit since have either been at The Palace of Auburn Hills, Ford Field or, starting in 2018, Little Caesars Arena. While both Cole Field House and Freedom Hall have both been replaced, only Freedom Hall's replacement, the KFC Yum! Center, has hosted games since. Games in the Washington area have since been played at either Baltimore, Landover or in Washington itself at Capital One Arena. All subsequent tournament games played in Atlanta are now played at either the Georgia Dome (since demolished) or Mercedes-Benz Stadium. Any future tournament games played in Charlotte would be played at Spectrum Center (although the Coliseum did host the Final Four in 1994).

Teams

Bracket
* – Denotes overtime period

East Regional – East Rutherford, New Jersey

Southeast Regional – Charlotte, North Carolina

Midwest Regional – Pontiac, Michigan

West Regional – Seattle, Washington

Final Four – Indianapolis, Indiana

Broadcast information
For the first time, CBS Sports showed all 63 tournament games. In the first three rounds, games were shown on a regional basis, except for one game each on Saturday and Sunday in the second round. Usual start times were noon and 7:30 or 8 p.m. Eastern time on each of the Thursdays and Fridays. During the weekend of the second round, the national telecast began at noon, with the regional windows (three on Saturday, two on Sunday) following. Although the times would be adjusted, the same basic format was in place until 2010. As of 2011, the regional broadcasts have been replaced by simulcast feeds on non-broadcast networks owned by Turner Sports.

Announcers
Jim Nantz and Billy Packer – Midwest Regional at Pontiac, Michigan; Final Four at Indianapolis, Indiana
Dick Stockton and Billy Cunningham – First and Second Rounds at Minneapolis, Minnesota; West Regional at Seattle, Washington
James Brown and Bill Raftery – First and Second Rounds at Dayton, Ohio; East Regional at East Rutherford, New Jersey
Greg Gumbel and Quinn Buckner – First and Second Rounds at Tucson, Arizona; Southeast Regional at Charlotte, North Carolina
Verne Lundquist and Len Elmore – First and Second Rounds at College Park, Maryland
Brad Nessler and Mimi Griffin – First and Second Rounds at Atlanta, Georgia
Tim Ryan and Dan Bonner – First and Second Rounds at Syracuse, New York
Sean McDonough and Bill Walton – First and Second Rounds at Louisville, Kentucky
Mel Proctor and Jack Givens – First and Second Rounds at Salt Lake City, Utah

Miscellaneous
Duke's 79–77 win over UNLV in the Final Four became one of the biggest upsets in tournament history. Duke was an 8-point underdog in the game. UNLV's juggernaut 1990–91 squad ranked #2 on ESPN Classic's Who's #1? for Best Teams Not To Win a Title. UNLV was undefeated entering the 1991 tournament, which was unmatched until Wichita State in 2014 and Kentucky in 2015. (Saint Joseph's went unbeaten in the 2004 regular season, finishing 27–0, but lost in their conference tournament before the NCAAs. Alcorn State went unbeaten in the 1979 regular season, but got invited to the NIT since the Southwestern Athletic Conference did not have an automatic bid to the NCAAs, and lost to eventual winner Indiana in the 2nd round. Indiana is the last team to win the championship undefeated in 1976).
This was Duke's fourth (of five) consecutive Final Four trip, the first team to achieve such a feat since UCLA. Since freshmen were not eligible at the time of UCLA's run, Duke's Greg Koubek became the first player to play in four Final Fours, a record matched by Duke teammates Christian Laettner and Brian Davis the next year when the team repeated as national champions.
For the first time in tournament history a 15-seed defeated a 2-seed. Richmond defeated Syracuse 73–69. Since then this has happened nine additional times: in 1993, Santa Clara defeated Arizona 64–61; in 1997, Coppin State defeated South Carolina 78–65; in 2001, Hampton defeated Iowa State 58–57; on the same day in 2012 Norfolk State defeated Missouri 86–84 and Lehigh defeated Duke 75–70; in 2013 Florida Gulf Coast defeated Georgetown 78–68; in 2016, Middle Tennessee defeated Michigan State 90–81; in 2021, Oral Roberts defeated Ohio State 75–72; in 2022, Saint Peter's defeated Kentucky 85–79; and in 2023 Princeton defeated Arizona 59-55.
In the Final Four against Kansas, legendary North Carolina coach Dean Smith was ejected from the game for leaving the coach's box.
For bracketologists, this tournament is notable for several reasons. The first is the upset-heavy opening round, which led to every seed number except 16 being represented by at least one team in the second round. The East region, in particular, featured first round victories by seeds 9, 10, 12, 13, and 15. Two 11's and a 14-seed advanced in the other regions. The second round is equally remarkable because there were no upsets in this round whatsoever. The combination of these two anomalies led to an unprecedented occurrence in which a 10 (Temple), an 11 (Connecticut), and a 12-seed (Eastern Michigan) advanced to the Sweet Sixteen without any of the teams pulling off consecutive upsets. The reason for this was that the first round successes of 15-seed Richmond, 14-seed Xavier, and 13-seed Penn State led to Temple, Connecticut, and Eastern Michigan (respectively) being considered favorites for their second round matchups.
This was the first NCAA Tournament to feature all four of the North Carolina-based Atlantic Coast Conference teams, also known as the Tobacco Road or Big Four teams: North Carolina, NC State, Duke and Wake Forest.
The Final Four was also the first to include both halves of the North Carolina–Duke rivalry. Had both teams won, they would have faced each other for the national championship, but to this day, the teams have only faced each other once each in the NCAA tournament and the NIT – the 1971 NIT semifinals at Madison Square Garden, which North Carolina won 73–67 and the 2022 Final Four at the Caesars Superdome, which the 8th-seeded Tar Heels won 81–77 in the last game of Mike Krzyzewski's coaching career.
This tournament featured three play-in games before the tournament field was announced, featuring the champions of the six conferences with the lowest computer ratings the previous season. The results were: Saint Francis, Pennsylvania (NEC) defeated Fordham (Patriot) 70–64, Coastal Carolina (Big South) over Jackson State (SWAC) 78–59, and NE Louisiana (Southland) over Florida A&M (MEAC) 87–63. These are not opening round games and the losers are not credited with an NCAA tournament appearance.
 UNLV's semi-final loss in the NCAA tournament brought an end to their astounding 45-game win streak. That is the fourth-longest consecutive-game win streak in NCAA Division 1 basketball history, and the longest win streak since the longest one ever (by UCLA) ended in 1974.
DePaul's appearance is, as of 2022, the last appearance of an independent team in the tournament. The Blue Demons would join the Great Midwest Conference in 1991; Notre Dame, the last prominent independent, would join the Big East in 1995. Though there have been independent teams since, most have been minor programs, or programs in transition between conference affiliations. It was also the last tournament to feature an East Coast Conference team; the conference, which was born in 1974 from former Middle Atlantic Conference teams, would cease operations in 1994 after most of the teams joined larger conferences.

See also
 1991 NCAA Division II men's basketball tournament
 1991 NCAA Division III men's basketball tournament
 1991 NCAA Division I women's basketball tournament
 1991 NCAA Division II women's basketball tournament
 1991 NCAA Division III women's basketball tournament
 1991 National Invitation Tournament
 1991 National Women's Invitation Tournament
 1991 NAIA Division I men's basketball tournament
 1991 NAIA Division I women's basketball tournament

References

NCAA Division I men's basketball tournament
Ncaa
Basketball competitions in Charlotte, North Carolina
March 1991 sports events in the United States
April 1991 sports events in the United States
1991 in Seattle
1991 in sports in Washington (state)
Basketball competitions in Seattle
Sports in Pontiac, Michigan
Basketball competitions in Indianapolis
1990s in Indianapolis
1991 in sports in Indiana
College basketball tournaments in Michigan